The 2022 United Rugby Championship Final was the final match of the 2021–22 United Rugby Championship season. The first United Rugby Championship Final was an all-South African derby with the Stormers defeating the Bulls 18–13 in Cape Town.

Pre-match
The match was televised free-to-air by RTÉ 2 in the Republic of Ireland. It was also shown on Premier Sports in the UK.

Details

References

2022
United Rugby Championship Final
Stormers matches
Bulls (rugby union) matches
2021–22 United Rugby Championship